Outlaws is a first-person shooter developed and published by LucasArts in  April 7, 1997. Set in the Wild West, it follows retired U.S. Marshal James Anderson, who seeks to bring justice to a gang of criminals who killed his wife and kidnapped his daughter. It uses an enhanced version of the Jedi game engine, first seen in Star Wars: Dark Forces. It is also largely credited as the first shooter game with a sniper zoom, as well as one of the first to feature a gun reloading mechanic. LucasArts' INSANE animation engine was used to render computer graphics animation sequences. These have special filters to look hand-drawn, and play between each mission and set up the action in the next area.

The game received generally favorable reviews from critics. While the graphics were often the topic of scrutiny and comparison to better looking titles of the time, such as Quake, reviewers were largely unanimous in praising the game's orchestral soundtrack, composed by Clint Bajakian, and solid gameplay. The voice cast includes veteran talent such as John de Lancie, Richard Moll and Jack Angel. A free expansion, entitled Handful of Missions, was released in 1998. Community-created expansion levels are also available and have received media coverage. Although not a huge financial success, the game has a cult following.

Gameplay

Outlaws is a first-person shooter. Players control the character as he utilizes several American Old West weapons and items, such as a rifle, shotgun, dynamite and revolver. The player can activate the lantern inventory item to lighten dark areas, and use a shovel in specific areas to dig holes. In the lower difficulty levels, termed Good and Bad, the player is able to sustain several bullet wounds with no apparent ill effects. In the hardest difficulty level, Ugly, the player's resistance is reduced to one or two shots. This forces the player into a different style of play.  Where on the easier difficulty levels a player might charge into a gunfight heedless of Anderson's personal health, in Ugly mode, the player must use stealth and cover to win.

Aside from the main single player campaign, Outlaws includes a set of five discrete missions that chronicle Anderson's rise to the rank of U.S. Marshal. Each of the missions requires Anderson to either capture or kill a specific outlaw. Ranks (Deputy, Sheriff, and Marshal) are awarded on the accumulation of a set number of points. Points are awarded for recovering stolen gold, capturing/killing the outlaw, and for killing enemies. Each outlaw that the player captures or kills appears in a jail cell in Anderson's field office. More points are awarded for capturing an outlaw than for killing one, due to the difficulty in capturing one alive. Completion of the Historical Missions is not a requirement for playing the single player campaign.

Outlaws also features a multiplayer deathmatch in four variants, including a Kill the Fool with the Chicken mode. Multiplayer can be played over local area network, and it was one of the featured games on the MSN Gaming Zone before its demise. The player can assume the role of one of six characters from the main game: James Anderson, Matt "Dr. Death" Jackson, "Bloody" Mary Nash, Chief Two-Feathers, "Gentleman" Bob Graham, and "Spittin'" Jack Sanchez. Each character has its own advantages and disadvantages in terms of speed/maneuverability, weapons selection, and resistance.

Plot
James Anderson, a retired U.S. Marshal, comes home after a trip to the general store to find his wife Anna dying and that his daughter Sarah has been kidnapped by two outlaws known as Matt "Dr. Death" Jackson and "Slim" Sam Fulton, under the employ of the railroad baron Bob Graham. Graham has hired several wanted outlaws to "enlighten" the people of the county to sell their land to him, so that he can make a profit off of a huge railroad. However, the psychotic Dr. Death misinterprets Graham's meaning of enlightenment, attacks Anna and leaves her for dead, kidnaps Anderson's daughter, and burns his home to the ground. After burying his wife, the retired Marshal picks up his gun once again and rides off to find his daughter. He travels around the old West, shooting his way through each member of Graham's hired outlaws.

On his journey Anderson is haunted by dreams of his father's murder as a child. He recalls that while the two were camping out in the wild, an unknown assailant shot his father in his sleep for no specific reason, but left young James alive, telling him "to keep that fear [of death], kid". After questioning more and more outlaws, Anderson is confronted by Dr. Death in an old mine. Anderson eventually gets the drop on him; he gets tangled up in a rope above a deep mine shaft. Dr. Death tells him that his daughter is hidden in an old Indian cliff village. After finding out that Anderson is not going to let him out of the pit, he teases Anderson about the murder of his wife. Anderson is enraged and puts his cigar in the pulley from which the rope is hanging, eventually burning up the rope and sending Dr. Death plummeting to his demise at the bottom of the shaft.

At the Indian village, Anderson is ambushed by renegade Indian Two Feathers. After defeating him, Two Feathers praises Anderson's strength in battle, and out of sympathy because he once had a child he had lost, tells him the real location of Sarah: Bob Graham's estate, Big Rock ranch. Anderson blasts his way into Graham's villa, and finally confronts him. After a fierce gunfight, Graham is believed dead and falls to the ground, and Anderson reunites with his daughter. Graham, clinging to life and gun trained on Anderson, reveals that he was the one who murdered Anderson's father. Just as Graham is about to finish off Anderson, Sarah manages to shoot Graham with Anderson's gun avenging her grandfather's death.  After a tearful reunion, father and daughter ride into the sunset.

Development

Outlaws is powered by an upgraded version of the Jedi engine, which was previously used on Star Wars: Dark Forces. LucasArts' INSANE animation engine is used to display the game's cutscenes. The game was also originally planned to have 12 unique multiplayer characters, each with their own in-game attributes. The final release halved that number to six characters. The game was inspired by western films such as The Good, the Bad and the Ugly and A Fistful of Dollars, as well as other Clint Eastwood westerns. It was released for Microsoft Windows on April 7, 1997. It is the first video game to feature a sniper zoom, and one of the earliest examples of a reloading mechanic. Despite the serious tone of the game, Outlaws maintained a few easter egg jokes, including Max of the Sam & Max series, hidden inside a building, a pair of grey aliens experimenting on a cow, and several references to the Indiana Jones series of games and movies.

In 1997, LucasArts released a patch to update the game to version 1.1 to add Glide and Aureal A3D, and another one to add Direct3D compatibility to the game in 2001, complementing the existing software rendering support. Shortly after the initial release, a small official expansion pack called Handful of Missions was released for free. It added four single player missions as well as multiplayer maps and updated the game to version 2.0. Outlaws is listed as one of noted game designer John Romero's all-time favorite games. On March 19, 2015, Disney Interactive re-released the game for Digital distribution on GOG.com. In contrast, the community-created XL Engine allows players to use their original CD to play through the game with a modern setting.

In 1998, LucasArts released a set of four single player missions, called Handful of Missions, for download from the official website. The package includes several new multiplayer missions, and a patch to update the game to version 2.0. The single player missions take place outside of the original game's story, and each level is unrelated to the next. Third party levels have been created by the game's community. On April 5, 2013 GameSpot and several other media outlets organized a playthrough of several LucasArts games to honor the then recently closed developer. GameSpot staff noted that the "community for [Outlaws] has created like 75 user generated maps." In reality more than 1,500 custom multiplayer maps have been created since Outlaws was released, and maps continued to be released until late 2012.

Music for the game was scored by composer Clint Bajakian. An orchestra was used with authentic instruments which was uncommon at that time. In total, Mixed Mode CD contains fifteen different audio tracks which were suitable for playback on a regular CD player. It is noteworthy that the crystal case of the game's original release had a tracklist printed on its back side as it is the case with most normal audio CDs.

Several veteran actors lend their voices to the game. John de Lancie portrays Matt Jackson, Richard Moll of Night Court plays Bob Graham. Veteran voice actor Jack Angel portrays two characters, George Bowers and Jack Sanchez. Jeff Osterhage, himself a veteran of western television films, voices the game's protagonist, U.S. Marshal James Anderson.

Reception

Outlaws received mostly positive reviews from critics. It has been featured in multiple Best Of lists since its release. Complex.com writer Gus Turner included it in his list of The 25 Best LucasArts Games. Of its legacy Turner said it was not a "major financial success, the title has only been able to attract a cult following since its release." Brittany Vincent of ShackNews placed it on her list of Five LucasArts Classics Ripe for Remakes, and noted that it "deserves another chance to woo gamers."

Next Generation stated that "Outlaws uses the Dark Forces engine, and it shows. The graphics are a bit outdated, a bit disorienting, and more than a bit pixelated in close. The game's saving grace is its plot, admittedly and oft-overlooked aspect of this genre."

GameSpot reviewer Chris Hudak commended the game's story and cinematic cutscenes, calling it a "movie-worthy experience" and citing the cinematic and musical influences of Sergio Leone's spaghetti westerns and Ennio Morricone's scores, respectively; he overall praised the game and called it "the most complete and faithful Old West shooter in the industry to date". In a retrospective review of the game, Kotaku editor Luke Plunkett praised the game's soundtrack and called the multiplayer "excellent." Plunkett cited the release of the visually superior Quake a year earlier and Half-Life not long after as factors that led to the game fading into obscurity for most players. The Escapist'''s Stew Shearer gave high marks for the game's villains; he called them "fun to hate." He stated that Outlaws "isn't just Doom with cowboys; you can tell that the developers put some real hard work into making the player feel like they're the hero in a Sergio Leone flick." The reviewer for Computer Games Magazine noted that while the game did not look as visually appealing as its competitors, other developers should "show as much thought in level and multiplayer design."

Some reviewers were more critical of the game. The reviewer for Computer Gaming World said that "There's nothing really wrong with Outlaws. There just isn't much right with it." The reviewer noted that the game had excellent music and art, but felt that the game had nothing new or innovative to offer players. Edge magazine's reviewer stated that "not for the first time, shown that it's not infallible." Charlie Brooker of PC Zone (UK) had to take time to warm up to the game. "when you start playing Outlaws, it feels downright cruddy." Brooker stated that after a lengthy amount of play his opinion changed, and ultimately he gave the game a favorable review.Computer Gaming World gave the soundtrack for Outlaws its 1997 "Musical Achievement" award. Outlaws was a finalist for the Academy of Interactive Arts & Sciences (AIAS) Interactive Achievement Awards 1998 for "Outstanding Achievement in Sound and Music" Award, which ultimately went to PaRappa the Rapper. In 2008 IGN selected the soundtrack from Outlaws'' to its "10 Great Videogame Albums" list.

References

External links

Official website archived via the Wayback Machine
LucasArts Entertainment's 20th anniversary recap

1997 video games
American Civil War video games
First-person shooters
LucasArts games
Sprite-based first-person shooters
Video games developed in the United States
Video games set in the United States
Video games with expansion packs
Western (genre) video games
Windows games
Windows-only games
Multiplayer and single-player video games
Video games with 2.5D graphics
Video games about police officers
Video games scored by Clint Bajakian
Video games set in the 19th century